The Fighting 69th is a 1940 American war film starring James Cagney, Pat O'Brien, and George Brent. The plot is based upon the actual exploits of New York City's 69th Infantry Regiment during World War I. The regiment was given that nickname when opposing General Robert E. Lee during the American Civil War.

Real people portrayed in The Fighting 69th include Father Francis P. Duffy, the chaplain; battalion commander and future OSS leader "Wild Bill" Donovan; Lt. Oliver Ames, a platoon commander; and then-Sgt. Joyce Kilmer (Jeffrey Lynn), a famous poet, who was killed in battle on July 30, 1918.

Most of The Fighting 69th was filmed at Warner Brothers' Calabasas Ranch location, which served as Camp Mills, the regiment's training base, various French villages, and numerous battlefields.

Plot
The plot centers on misfit Jerry Plunkett (James Cagney), a tough-talking New Yorker who displays a mixture of bravado and disrespect for officers. Caught up in patriotic fervor when the United States enters WWI, he joins the 69th with aim of winning medals by singlehandedly defeating the Germans.

However, Plunkett's inexperience and disrespect for command lead to him making errors in battle and eventually show him to be a coward. The chaplain, Father Francis P. Duffy (Pat O'Brien) believes there to be something more in the young man and begs the 69th's commanding officer Major "Wild Bill" Donovan (George Brent) to give Plunkett one more chance. Donovan reluctantly agrees and when the 69th is ordered to send a squad into no man's land to capture German soldiers for intel, Donovan orders Plunkett to join them.

Plunkett's inexperience and nervousness lead to him accidentally disclosing the squad's position and leads to the deaths of two well respected soldiers Lieutenant "Long John" Wynn (Dick Foran) and Private Timothy "Timmy" Wynn (William Lundigan). Donovan is outraged and ultimately orders Plunkett to be court-martialed. However, while he is awaiting execution, Fr Duffy approaches Plunkett in one last attempt to save him spiritually. Plunkett begs the priest to release him so he can desert the army and escape the war. Fr Duffy declines his request and when his jail cell is destroyed by a German shell and he is freed, Plunkett witnesses Father Duffy ministering to several wounded troops, urging them to keep their faith and have courage.

Shamed and inspired by Donovan's forbearance and courage, Plunkett decides to rejoin his unit at the front and support their advance. However, when he catches up with the 69th he spots that the battalion has been stopped by a fierce German bombardment. Coming across a mortar whose crew have almost all been killed, he finds Sgt. "Big Mike" Wynn and implores the older man to tell him how to operate the mortar. Sgt. Wynn initially refuses as he recalls how Plunkett had caused the death of his two brothers in an earlier encounter with the enemy.

Plunkett though perseveres and starts to use the mortar to counter the German bombardment and allow the 69th to push ahead with the advance. The Germans though counter and throw a grenade into the trench where Plunkett and Sgt. Wynn are. In one desperate act of heroism he sacrifices his life by diving on the grenade in a bid to protect "Big Mike". Plunkett is mortally wounded and succumbs to his wounds leaving Major Donovan and Sgt Wynn in shock at the young man's true bravery.

While Jerry Plunkett was a fictional character, Father Duffy, Major Donovan, Lt. Ames, and poet Joyce Kilmer were all real members of the 69th. Many of the events depicted (training at Camp Mills, the Mud March, dugout collapse at Rouge Bouquet, crossing the Ourcq River, Victory Parade, etc.) actually happened.

Cast

 James Cagney as Private Jerry Plunkett
 Pat O'Brien as Father Francis P. Duffy
 George Brent as Major "Wild Bill" Donovan
 Jeffrey Lynn as Sergeant Joyce Kilmer
 Alan Hale, Sr. as Sergeant "Big Mike" Wynn
 Frank McHugh as Terence "Crepe-Hanger" Burke
 Dennis Morgan as Lieutenant Oliver Ames
 Dick Foran as Lieutenant "Long John" Wynn
 William Lundigan as Private Timothy "Timmy" Wynn 
 Guinn Williams as Paddy Dolan
 Henry O'Neill as The Colonel
 John Litel as Captain Mangan

 Sammy Cohen as "Mike Murphy" 
 Harvey Stephens as Major Alex Anderson
 William Hopper as Private Turner
 Tom Dugan as Private McManus
 Frank Wilcox as Lieutenant John Norman
 George Reeves as Jack O'Keefe
 Frank Coghlan, Jr. as Jimmy
 Herbert Anderson as Casey
 Richard Clayton as Tierney
 Eddie Dew as Regan
 Frank Mayo as Capt. Bootz (uncredited) 
 Roland Varno as German Officer (uncredited)

Production
John T. Prout, an Irish American who was a former Captain in the regiment and a general in the  Irish Army, was the movie's "technical advisor".

Priscilla Lane was initially cast as one of the soldiers' girls back home, but the part was cut prior to production. No female characters are seen in the film.

Reception
According to Warner Bros. records, the film made $1,822,000 domestically and $491,000 foreign, for a worldwide total of $2,313,000.

References
Notes

External links
 
 
 
 
  Fighting 69th Historical Association

1940 films
1940s war films
American black-and-white films
1940s English-language films
Warner Bros. films
Western Front (World War I) films
Films about capital punishment
Films directed by William Keighley
Films scored by Adolph Deutsch
American war films
1940s American films